Pusillanthus is a genus of flowering plants belonging to the family Loranthaceae.

Its native range is Venezuela, Northeastern Brazil.

Species:

Pusillanthus pubescens 
Pusillanthus trichodes

References

Loranthaceae
Loranthaceae genera